Tjerita Sie Po Giok, atawa Peroentoengannja Satoe Anak Piatoe (better known by the short title Sie Po Giok) is a 1911 children's novel from the Dutch East Indies (now Indonesia) written by Tio Ie Soei in vernacular Malay. It tells the story of Sie Po Giok, a young orphan who faces several challenges while living with his uncle in Batavia (now Jakarta). The story, which has been called the only work of children's literature produced by Chinese Malay writers, has been read as promoting traditional gender roles and questioning Chinese identity.

Plot

Eleven-year-old Sie Po Giok has been orphaned for some months and now lives with his uncle, Sie Thian Bie, his uncle's wife, and their seven children at their home in Batavia (now Jakarta). He is sensitive, well-mannered, and polite, yet feels insecure as if he has become a burden to the middle-class family. Moreover, two of Thian Bie's sons—Po Houw and Po Soeij—hate Po Giok. However, Po Giok can usually confide in Thian Bie's eldest daughter, nine-year-old Kim Nio.

One day, as Thian Bie is preparing to leave the city, he tells the children that someone has been stealing fruit from their orchard and that they should keep their eyes open. At night Po Giok sees a neighbourhood boy who sometimes works for them, 17-year-old Ho Kim Tjiang, stealing some guavas. When Po Giok attempts to accost Kim Tjiang, the bigger boy orders him to keep silent or else face Kim Tjiang's wrath; Po Giok promises not to tell anyone. When Thian Bie returns he is extremely distraught, but Po Giok remains silent. Ultimately, however, after several days Po Giok's conscience wins out and he tells his uncle about Kim Tjiang's deeds. Thian Bie then catches the boy and fires him. Kim Tjiang goes home and complains to his mother, who promises that they will have their revenge. Po Giok, meanwhile, is called a coward for not immediately exposing the perpetrator of the crime.

Conflict between Po Giok and Po Houw becomes exacerbated when Po Giok consistently performs better than his cousin at school and, after the two fight, Po Houw is punished by their teacher. When Thian Bie tells the children not to eat some sawo which he is putting aside as a wedding present, Po Houw is severely tempted. When nobody is looking he furtively steals a single fruit and eats it, then slips the skin into a nearby window leading to Po Giok's room. When the sawo skin is found, Po Giok is accused of having stolen it, and no matter how hard he pleads his innocence he is unable to dispel this lie.

The following morning Thian Bie, hungover from a party the night before, forces Po Giok to pray to his parents then takes a stick of rattan and beats the boy "half dead" when he refuses to admit to the theft. Over the following days Po Giok faints and is unable to go to school; he is further alienated from his adoptive family. Ultimately, however, Thian Bie learns that it was in fact Po Houw who had stolen the fruit. As Thian Bie prepares to hit the boy Po Giok insists that Po Houw not be harmed, a plea which Thian Bie heeds; instead, Po Houw is forced to eat separately from the family. Po Houw and Po Soeij slowly warm to their cousin as they see his pure heart.

Po Giok later hears from his teacher that his long-lost uncle, Tjan Haij Boen, wants to take him as a son. When Haij Boen meets with Po Giok and Thian Bie, they agree that Po Giok will join Haij Boen in China in several months, after completing his schooling. However, before this plan can be set into motion Kim Tjiang—long unable to find a job in Batavia owing to his theft—sets fire to the Sie family's home. As Kim Tjiang escapes with some of their valuables, Po Giok rescues Kim Nio from the burning building. They are both severely injured, but survive. At the agreed time, Po Giok goes with Haij Boen to China, where he becomes immensely wealthy over the next twenty years.

Writing

Sie Po Giok was written by Tio Ie Soei, a Batavia-born journalist of Chinese descent. It was his first novel. The story consists of eighteen chapters and has multiple footnotes in which Tio expands on the content, including one towards the end of the novel which tells the reader the ultimate fates of Thian Bie and his children.

Themes

Sim Chee Cheang of the Universiti Malaysia Sabah categorises Sie Po Giok as one of several Chinese Malay works which seemingly aimed to "impart morals according to the teachings of Confucius" by highlighting the "moral decay" of Chinese in the Dutch East Indies (now Indonesia) and of using Confucianism to overcome it. She writes that, along with Thio Tjin Boen's Tjerita Oeij Se (1903), Gouw Peng Liang's Lo Fen Koei (1903), Oei Soei Tiong's Njai Alimah (1904), and Hauw San Liang's Pembalesan Kedji (1907), Sie Po Giok actually "looked back to the 'past', questioning and critiquing the Chinese past and identity." These themes, according to Sim, are shown through the main characters' ultimately futile attempt to find happiness by applying traditional beliefs.

Sim also notes a predominant theme of submissiveness amongst the female characters, a reinforcement of traditional gender roles. She writes that Po Giok's aunt is only seen to prepare food or plead for her husband to stop beating Po Giok. Kim Nio, meanwhile, is only able to support Po Giok emotionally, but cannot protect him physically and is unable to stop her father's beatings or brothers' hatred of the orphan.

Release and reception

Sie Po Giok was first printed as a serial in the Chinese-run daily Sin Po, where it was a success. The story was then novelised in 1911 (some sources give 1912) and published by Hoa Siang In Giok, a publishing house owned by Tio's in-laws; a second edition was published by Goan Hong & Co. in 1921. In 2000 the book was reprinted, using the Perfected Spelling System, in the first volume of Kesastraan Melayu Tionghoa dan Kebangsaan Indonesia, an anthology of Chinese Malay literature.

In his history of Chinese Malay literature, Nio Joe Lan wrote that Sie Po Giok was the only book produced by Chinese writers which was fit for children to read. He notes that Tio made the audience explicit in his foreword, which also included a statement directed at female readers. Other works directed at younger readers were educational ones, such as for studying the alphabet.

Notes

Footnotes

References

1911 novels
Malay-language novels
Children's novels
Chinese Malay literature
1911 children's books
Novels first published in serial form
Novels about orphans